Matías Aguirregaray Guruceaga (born 1 April 1989) is a Uruguayan professional footballer who plays as a defender for Uruguayan Primera División club Peñarol.

His nickname is "El Vasquito". He also holds a Spanish passport, allowing him to be counted as an EU player.

Club career
Aguirregaray made his professional debut in 2007 with Peñarol and spent four full seasons with the club.

In October 2010 he joined Tercera División club Terrassa FC, in order to help him gain a Spanish passport to ease a potential move to a higher-rank team within Europe. He never played a single game with the Catalans.

On 24 August 2011, Serie A club Palermo confirmed to have signed Aguirregaray on loan from Montevideo Wanderers F.C., with an option to fully acquire the player's transfer right by the end of the season. He made his debut as a second-half substitute for Nicolás Bertolo in a Serie A home game against Cagliari, ended in a 3–2 win for his side.

In July 2013 he signed a contract with Argentine club Estudiantes de La Plata.

International career

Aguirregaray took part at the 2009 South American U-20 Championship and the 2009 FIFA U-20 World Cup as part of the Uruguayan under-20 team.

He was part of Uruguay's 2012 Olympic squad.

In September 2012, he was called up to the Uruguayan senior side for two World Cup qualifying matches against Colombia and Ecuador, but failed to make debut. He finally made his debut to the senior squad in February 2013 in a 3–1 friendly loss against Spain, coming on as a substitute.

Personal life
Matias is the son of former Peñarol player Óscar Aguirregaray.

References

External links
 
 
 

1989 births
Living people
Uruguayan footballers
Uruguayan expatriate footballers
Uruguay international footballers
Uruguay under-20 international footballers
Peñarol players
Estudiantes de La Plata footballers
Palermo F.C. players
CFR Cluj players
Club Tijuana footballers
UD Las Palmas players
Al-Fateh SC players
Uruguayan Primera División players
Serie A players
Liga I players
Argentine Primera División players
Liga MX players
La Liga players
Footballers at the 2012 Summer Olympics
Olympic footballers of Uruguay
2013 FIFA Confederations Cup players
Expatriate footballers in Argentina
Expatriate footballers in Italy
Expatriate footballers in Mexico
Expatriate footballers in Romania
Expatriate footballers in Spain
Uruguayan expatriate sportspeople in Italy
Uruguayan expatriate sportspeople in Romania
Uruguayan people of Basque descent
Association football defenders
Footballers from Porto Alegre
Uruguayan expatriate sportspeople in Saudi Arabia
Expatriate footballers in Saudi Arabia
Saudi Professional League players